Chauntra is a small village in the Sri Muktsar Sahib district of Punjab, India. The villagers belongs to the Buttar clan of Jatts.

Geography

The coordinates  are the centre of the village, located in the Sri Muktsar Sahib district in the Indian state of Punjab.

Demographics

In 2001, according to the census, the village had the total population of 1,099 with 190 households, 577 males and 522 females. Thus males constitute 52.5% and females 47.5% of total population with the sex ratio of 904 females per thousand males.

Religion & Language

The villagers are Sikhs and follows Sikhism with Hindu minorities. Punjabi is the official and local language of the village.

Economy

Being the rural area of Punjab agriculture is the main occupation of the locals and the main source of income.

References

Villages in Sri Muktsar Sahib district